The 2010 Coke Zero 400 Powered by Coca-Cola, the 52nd running of the event, was a NASCAR Sprint Cup Series race held on July 3, 2010, at Daytona International Speedway in Daytona Beach, Florida as the 18th race – and official halfway point – of the 2010 NASCAR Sprint Cup Series season. It was scheduled to begin at 7:30 p.m. US EDT, but began at 9:24 US EDT due to a rain delay the race began.  It was telecast on TNT and Motor Racing Network (terrestrial) and Sirius XM Radio (satellite) by radio at 6:30 p.m. EDT.

Kevin Harvick won the race, while Kasey Kahne finished second and Jeff Gordon finished third. There were a total of nine cautions, one red flag, and 47 lead changes among 18 different drivers.

This was also the final race at Daytona on the pavement surface used since 1979. Re-paving the track was moved up two years due to pothole problems in the 2010 Daytona 500. Several preventive repairs were made between practice and qualifying sessions, but there were no delays at any time through the weekend because of potholes. Repaving began almost immediately after the race.

Report

Background
Prior to the race, Richard Childress Racing driver Kevin Harvick led the Drivers' Championship with 2,489 points, and Hendrick Motorsports driver Jimmie Johnson was second with 2,384 points. Behind them in the Drivers' Championship, Kyle Busch was third with 2,328 points in a Toyota, and Kyle Busch's teammate Denny Hamlin was fourth with 2,304 points. Jeff Gordon was fifth with 2,302 points. In the Manufacturers' Championship, Chevrolet was leading with 121 points, fourteen points ahead of their rival Toyota. In the battle for third place, Dodge had 74 points, two points ahead of Ford.

Practice and qualifying
Two practice sessions were held on Thursday before the Saturday race. The first session lasted 80 minutes, and the Thursday evening session lasted 85 minutes. During the first practice session, Kyle Busch and David Ragan collided to bring out the caution flag as Joey Logano was quickest. Clint Bowyer was in the second position, ahead of Ryan Newman and Matt Kenseth, while Tony Stewart was scored fifth. In the evening session, Robby Gordon was quickest, after Logano spun sideways. There was another caution later in the session, involving Denny Hamlin, Kyle Busch, Stewart, and Reed Sorenson. Greg Biffle was scored in second, ahead of Marcos Ambrose and Kasey Kahne in third and fourth. A. J. Allmendinger ended up fifth quickest.

During qualifying, forty-five cars were entered, but only forty-three was able to race because of NASCAR's qualifying procedure. Only twelve cars were able to qualify because of wet conditions. Kevin Harvick earned the pole position, because of being the points leader. He was joined on the front row of the grid by Jimmie Johnson, who was second in the point standings. Kyle Busch was third, as his teammate Hamlin was supposed to start in fourth, but had to go to the rear of the grid because of switching to a back-up car. Jeff Gordon started fourth, after being eighth in the second practice session. Kurt Busch, Kenseth, Jeff Burton, Stewart, Biffle, and Dale Earnhardt Jr. rounded off the top ten. The two drivers that did not qualify were Michael McDowell and Todd Bodine.

Race summary
In comparison to Friday's wet qualifying session, frequent showers soaked the track Saturday evening, making racing slippery and potentially hazardous which delayed the start of the race until 9:24 US EDT. However, pre-race ceremonies continued, as Pastor Corwin Lasenby Sr., from New Mt. Zion Missionary Baptist Church delivered the invocation. Then, Capitol Records Nashville recording artist Darius Rucker performed the United States National Anthem. By 8:13, forty-three minutes after the scheduled start time, the showers had moved away, and dryers started to dry the track. 43 minutes later, crew members and the drivers were called to pit road. Bobby Labonte ended pre-race ceremonies, giving the command from his Coke Zero-sponsored Phoenix Racing Chevrolet.

Kevin Harvick and Jimmie Johnson stayed side-by-side going through the first turn, but Johnson maintained a steady pace and passed Harvick. Jeff Gordon moved into 3rd, after starting in the 5th position. Johnson's vacated 2nd position was filled by Kyle Busch as Jeff Burton moved into the 8th spot. On lap 5, Harvick passed Johnson to begin leading the race. By lap 7, Johnson had fallen 3 places, as his teammate Gordon moved into the 3rd position. Three laps later, Gordon claimed the lead as Harvick battled him for it. Gordon fell to 13th after two laps since he claimed the lead. Greg Biffle, now 2nd, passed Harvick for the 1st position on lap 14. One lap later, Busch claimed the lead, as the competition caution decided by NASCAR officials, was displayed. While under caution, Max Papis and Dave Blaney exited the track to go to their garage stalls due to vibration and transmission problems.

Harvick led on the restart, from entering the track from pit road in first. Brad Keselowski climbed to 3rd a lap after starting 26th, as Elliott Sadler moved to the 3rd position. Harvick's vacated first position was taken by Sadler, as Busch improved his position to 2nd on the grid. Four laps later, Busch became the new leader, but Sadler would reclaim it during lap 29, when Busch had to make a pit stop. On lap 30, Busch's brother Kurt became the leader, as Sam Hornish Jr. moved into 2nd. Harvick reclaimed the lead on lap 32, but Ku. Busch maintained a position and became the new leader. Harvick dropped to 7th  two laps later. Johnson moved to 4th, after passing Hornish Jr. Soon after, Sadler reclaimed the 2nd position, as David Reutimann followed. On lap 41, Sadler became the new leader. Seven laps later, Johnson made a pit stop because of a tire problem, and Hornish Jr. took the lead on lap 50.

On lap 52, Matt Kenseth made a pit stop, as Ku. Busch passed Sadler for 2nd. Sadler fell to 4th on the next lap while Gordon and Juan Pablo Montoya moved into the 5th and 2nd positions. On lap 56, Montoya became the new leader, and J. J. Yeley had a flat tire, as drivers began to pit. As Montoya made a pit stop, debris from Yeley's race car brought out a caution on the next lap. The green flag returned on lap 63, as Gordon passed Montoya for first. On the following lap, A. J. Allmendinger collided with Ky. Busch, turned backwards, and collided with the wall. Gordon led the driver to the green flag on lap 69, but Keselowski led lap 70 after passing Gordon. Gordon reclaimed the lead after passing Keselowski. Then, Montoya reclaimed the lead from Gordon on lap 74.

Montoya led 2 laps before he was passed by Denny Hamlin. After 3 laps of leading, Hamlin was passed by Hornish Jr. on lap 79. Jamie McMurray moved into the 4th position on lap 85, after passing Montoya. With some help from Johnson, Ky. Busch claimed the lead one lap later. On lap 93, Burton passed Montoya for the 3rd position, then he passed Johnson 1 lap afterward. On lap 99, there were several pit stops that included Hornish, Keselowski, Ku. Busch, Reutimann, Gordon, and Sadler. Four laps later, Montoya and Ky. Busch collided with each other, causing the 18 car to turn sideways and crash into the wall, which brought out the 4th caution. Since Ky. Busch was the leader, Burton took his vacated first position. Mark Martin led the drivers to the green flag on lap 110, but Montoya passed him a lap later.

On lap 116, the fifth yellow flag was given. This happened when David Ragan, McMurray; and Martin Truex Jr. crashed into the wall when Ragan turned sideways. Tony Stewart led the field of drivers to green flag conditions on lap 121. During laps 126–134, there were several lead changes; the leaders were Burton, Clint Bowyer, and Harvick, then Burton took the lead. On lap 136, the sixth caution came out when Robert Richardson Jr. and David Stremme run into each other and turned sideways. Ku. Busch led the drivers to green, but Martin and Matt Kenseth both crashed into the wall, bringing out the seventh caution. Harvick led the drivers to the green flag on lap 145, but he couldn't keep Bowyer behind him. Two laps later, the race was red flagged for a large wreck involving 21 cars in turn 3, the largest crash since 2005. This began when Ku. Busch hit into Burton and ran him into Sam Hornish Jr. while behind them, Montoya turned Brad Keselowski into Reed Sorenson and Johnson. The smoke from the two collisions reduced visibility to the point that most of the field was collected behind them. Only a few drivers made it through cleanly. Mark Martin, who had damage from the crash that had brought out the seventh caution, hit the wall hardly, and Johnson's pit crew ran over from their stall to pull Martin out of his burning car when he came to pit road. The drivers involved included Burton, Ryan Newman, Bobby Labonte; Hornish Jr., Robby Gordon, Scott Speed, Greg Biffle, Paul Menard, Ku. Busch, Montoya, Keselowski, Regan Smith, Sorenson, Johnson, Joey Logano, Martin, Marcos Ambrose, and Stewart. Dale Earnhardt Jr. also collected minor damage to the right side of his car weaving through the wreckage. Bowyer stayed out to lead the drivers to the green flag on lap 152.

Two laps later, J. Gordon climbed into the 2nd position, as Harvick followed. On lap 157, Jeff Gordon claimed the lead. Two laps later, Bowyer reclaimed the lead, as the ninth caution was given because Ku. Busch; Hornish Jr.; and Sadler all ran into each other. 4 laps after the scheduled distance the green flag waved, as Bowyer led. On the last lap, Harvick passed Bowyer and crossed the finish line first to win his 2nd race in the 2010 season. Kasey Kahne finished 2nd, ahead of J. Gordon in 3rd. Kurt Busch finished seventh after three accidents in the last twelve laps.

Post-Race
Kevin Harvick appeared in victory lane after his victory lap to start celebrating his fourth win. In the subsequent press conference, Harvick said, "We're in a fortunate position with the start to our season, and we need to keep trying to make things better, you've just got to make it happen at the right time."

Harvick expressed his enjoyment of winning the race, but he also stated:

"I got behind Harvick and I thought that would be the spot, I was watching Jeff (Gordon) because I knew he would be coming and would be quick. It would have been nice to get our Budweiser Ford in Victory Lane," said Kasey Kahne following his second-place finish. The race result left Kevin Harvick leading the Driver's Championship with 2,684 points. Jeff Gordon was second with 2,472, thirteen points ahead of Jimmie Johnson and thirty-three ahead of Kurt Busch. Denny Hamlin was fifth with 2,400 points. In the Manufacturers' Championship, Chevrolet maintained their lead with 130 points. Toyota remained second with 110 points. Dodge followed with 78 points, even with Ford in fourth.

Race results

References

Coke Zero 400
Coke Zero 400
NASCAR races at Daytona International Speedway
3D television shows